Bannock County is a county in the southeastern part of Idaho. As of the 2020 Census, the population was 87,018, making it the sixth-most populous county in Idaho. The county seat and largest city is Pocatello. The county was established in 1893 and named after the local Bannock tribe. It is one of the counties with territories included in the Fort Hall Indian Reservation of the federally recognized Shoshone-Bannock Tribes.

Geography
The Portneuf River flows through the county, meeting the Snake River (the American Falls Reservoir) at the county's lowest point, its northwestern corner. Bonneville Peak, on the eastern border in the Portneuf Range, is the county's highest point at 9,271 feet (2825 m) ASL; on its western slopes is the Pebble Creek ski area.

Adjacent counties

Bingham County - north
Caribou County - east
Franklin County - southeast
Oneida County - southwest
Power County - west

Highways

 - Interstate 15
 - Interstate 86
 - US 30
 - US 91
 - SH-40

National protected area
 Caribou National Forest (part)

Demographics

Bannock County is part of the Pocatello, Idaho Metropolitan Statistical Area.

2000 census
As of the 2000 United States Census, there were 75,565 people, 27,192 households, and 19,224 families in the county. There were 29,102 housing units at an average density of 26 per square mile (10/km2). The racial makeup of the county was 91.29% White, 0.59% Black or African American, 2.91% Native American, 0.99% Asian, 0.16% Pacific Islander, 2.08% from other races, and 1.98% from two or more races. 4.68% of the population were Hispanic or Latino of any race. 23.1% were of English, 14.2% German, 11.1% American, and 7.4% Irish ancestry.

There were 27,192 households, out of which 36.50% had children under the age of 18 living with them, 56.70% were married couples living together, 10.00% had a female householder with no husband present, and 29.30% were non-families. 22.80% of all households were made up of individuals, and 7.60% had someone living alone who was 65 years of age or older. The average household size was 2.69 and the average family size was 3.20.

The county population contained 28.10% under the age of 18, 14.60% from 18 to 24, 27.20% from 25 to 44, 20.00% from 45 to 64, and 10.10% who were 65 years of age or older. The median age was 30 years. For every 100 females, there were 97.70 males. For every 100 females aged 18 and over, there were 94.40 males.

The median income for a household in the county was $36,683, and the median income for a family was $44,192. Males had a median income of $36,056 versus $23,595 for females. The per capita income for the county was $17,148. About 9.80% of families and 13.90% of the population were below the poverty line, including 15.60% of those under age 18 and 7.60% of those aged 65 or over.

2010 census
As of the 2010 United States Census, there were 82,839 people, 30,682 households, and 20,836 families in the county. The racial makeup of the county was 89.8% white, 3.2% American Indian, 1.3% Asian, 0.8% black or African American, 0.2% Pacific Islander, 2.1% from other races, and 2.7% from two or more races. Those of Hispanic or Latino origin made up 6.7% of the population. In terms of ancestry, 23.4% were English, 16.9% were German, 9.3% were Irish, and 7.0% were American.

Of the 30,682 households, 35.5% had children under the age of 18 living with them, 52.2% were married couples living together, 10.7% had a female householder with no husband present, 32.1% were non-families, and 24.9% of all households were made up of individuals. The average household size was 2.64 and the average family size was 3.17. The median age was 31.4 years.

The median income for a household in the county was $44,848 and the median income for a family was $54,650. Males had a median income of $43,538 versus $28,870 for females. The per capita income for the county was $21,275. About 10.6% of families and 14.0% of the population were below the poverty line, including 16.6% of those under age 18 and 4.2% of those aged 65 or over.

Government and politics
The last Democratic candidate for President to win the county was Lyndon B. Johnson in 1964, although subsequent Republican victories have been by smaller margins than those in neighboring counties, due to the presence of Idaho State University. The closest a Democrat has gotten to winning Bannock County since 1964 was in 1992 when Bill Clinton lost to George H. W. Bush by 2.9 percent.

 
 
 
 
 
 
 
 
 
 
 
 
 
 
 
 
 
 
 
 
 
 
 
 
 
 
 
 
 

Similar to other Idaho counties, an elected three-member county commission heads the county government. Other elected officials include clerk, treasurer, sheriff, assessor, coroner, and prosecutor.

Like other eastern Idaho counties, Bannock County has a significant Latter Day Saint population which tends to strongly vote Republican. However, a substantial trade union presence in the county - as well as the Idaho State University community - often gives Democrats an overall advantage, especially in local races. Bannock County routinely elects more Democrats than Republicans to county-level offices.

At the state level, Bannock County is located in Legislative Districts 28 and 29. Democrats currently control two of these six seats in the Idaho Legislature. In 2016, Republicans were able to win House Seat A in District 29.

Idaho Department of Correction operates the Pocatello Women's Correctional Center (PWCC) in Pocatello and in Bannock County.

Communities

Cities

 Arimo
 Chubbuck
 Downey
 Inkom
 Lava Hot Springs
 McCammon
 Pocatello

Census-designated places
 Fort Hall (part)
 Tyhee

Unincorporated communities

 Blackrock
 Portneuf
 Robin
 Swanlake
 Virginia
 Zenda

Education
School districts include:
 Grace Joint School District 148
 Marsh Valley Joint School District 21
 Pocatello School District 25
 Preston Joint School District 201
 West Side Joint School District 202

There is also a Bureau of Indian Education (BIE)-affiliated school, Shoshone Bannock Jr./Sr. High School.

See also

 
 List of counties in Idaho
 National Register of Historic Places listings in Bannock County, Idaho

References

Further reading
The History of Bannock County, Idaho (1915)

External links
County website

 

 
Idaho counties
Pocatello, Idaho metropolitan area
1893 establishments in Idaho
Populated places established in 1893